Hussain Rahal (born 1988 in Syria) is a Syrian football player who is currently playing for Jableh SC, on loan from Al-Wathba.

References

1988 births
Association football goalkeepers
Living people
Syrian footballers
Al-Karamah players
Syrian Premier League players